Ledereragrotis is a genus of moths of the family Noctuidae.

Species
 Ledereragrotis difficilis (Erschoff, 1887)
 Ledereragrotis multifida (Lederer, 1870)

References
Natural History Museum Lepidoptera genus database
Ledereragrotis at funet

Noctuinae